Henri Leconte and Pavel Složil were the defending champions but only Složil competed that year with Tomáš Šmíd.

Složil and Šmíd lost in the first round to Eric Fromm and Eric Korita.

Mel Purcell and Stan Smith won in the final 6–3, 6–4 against Marcos Hocevar and Cássio Motta.

Seeds

  Pavel Složil /  Tomáš Šmíd (first round)
  Anders Järryd /  Hans Simonsson (quarterfinals)
  Anand Amritraj /  Brian Gottfried (first round)
  Tian Viljoen /  Danie Visser (first round)

Draw

External links
 1983 Fischer-Grand Prix Doubles draw

Doubles